Elfie Mayerhofer (1917–1992) was an Austrian film actress and singer. A noted stage performer, she played lead roles in a series of musical and operetta films such as The Song of the Nightingale (1944) and The Heavenly Waltz (1949). She was known as the "Viennese Nightingale".

Selected filmography
 Women for Golden Hill (1938)
 The Curtain Falls (1939)
 Hotel Sacher (1939)
 My Wife Theresa (1942)
 A Man With Principles? (1943)
 Music in Salzburg (1944)
 The Song of the Nightingale (1944)
 Viennese Melodies (1947)
 Anni (1948)
 The Court Concert (1948)
 The Heavenly Waltz (1948)
 Beloved Liar (1950)
 Kissing Is No Sin (1950)
 Vanished Melody (1952)
 Madame Pompadour (1960)

References

External links

Bibliography
 Fritsche, Maria. Homemade Men in Postwar Austrian Cinema: Nationhood, Genre and Masculinity. Berghahn Books, 2013. 
 Goble, Alan. The Complete Index to Literary Sources in Film. Walter de Gruyter, 1999.

1917 births
1992 deaths
Austrian film actresses
20th-century Austrian women singers
Actors from Maribor
20th-century Austrian actresses
Musicians from Maribor